Samuel Baddeley (12 July 1884 – Autumn 1960) was an English footballer. A centre-half, he played for Burslem Port Vale in 1906–07, before switching to Stoke after Vale quit the Football League. Stoke also resigned, and he helped the club to two Southern Football League Division Two titles and one Birmingham & District League title. His brothers, Amos, George, and Tom were all professional footballers.

Career

Burslem Port Vale
Baddeley had two spells with Ball Green and also played for Endon and Norton before joining Burslem Port Vale in October 1905. Both he and William Dodds made their débuts on 1 September 1906; in a 2–1 defeat to Leicester Fosse at the Athletic Ground. He played 30 Second Division games by the end of the season, but was transferred to local rivals Stoke in June 1907 as Vale went into financial meltdown.

Stoke
Baddeley joined Stoke at the start of the 1907–08 season, in what was their first season in the Second Division. As well as Vale, Stoke were also having a financial crisis and at the end of the season Stoke entered liquidation. As a result, Stoke left the Football League and thus many of their players departed the club. However Baddeley stayed at the Victoria Ground, and featured 32 times in the Birmingham & District League in 1908–09. He scored twice in 48 appearances in 1909–10, helping Stoke to top the Southern Football League Division Two A. He made 56 appearances in 1910–11, as the "Potters" won the Birmingham & District League and finished second in the Southern Football League Division Two. He scored twice in 20 games in 1911–12, as Stoke concentrated on the Southern League Division One. He featured 31 times in 1912–13, as the club were relegated in last place. He then played eight times in 1913–14 and twice in 1914–15, as Stoke won promotion as champions of Division Two. After leaving Stoke in 1915 he went on to join Kidsgrove Wellington. During his time at Stoke he played alongside Amos Baddeley, George Baddeley, and Tom Baddeley.

Style of play
Baddeley was a defender noted for his tough-tackling and determination.

Career statistics
Source:

Honours
Stoke
Southern Football League Division Two A: 1909–10
Birmingham & District League: 1910–11
Southern Football League Division Two: 1914–15

References

1884 births
1960 deaths
Footballers from Staffordshire
English footballers
Association football midfielders
Port Vale F.C. players
Stoke City F.C. players
English Football League players
Southern Football League players